Graettinger Community School District was a school district headquartered in Graettinger, Iowa.

On July 1, 2010, it merged with the Terril Community School District to form the Graettinger–Terril Community School District.

References

External links
 

Defunct school districts in Iowa
2010 disestablishments in Iowa
School districts disestablished in 2010
Education in Palo Alto County, Iowa